Philippe Lazare (born October 30, 1956) is a French businessman who has been the Chief Executive Officer of Ingenico, an electronic payment solutions company, since January 2010.

Biography
Lazare was appointed Managing Director of Ingenico on July 17, 2007 after working as director since 2005. He became Chief Executive Officer following the decision by the company's Board of Directors on January 20, 2010.

Education
Lazare trained as an architect at Ecole Supérieure d’Architecture de Paris-La Défense. He left the university with a diploma in Architecture.

Decoration
He is a Knight of the French Legion of Honour.

Quotes
In December 2012, the magazine Challenges rated him number one in the Top 10 most successful business leaders (excluding CAC40 businesses). This rating concerns companies with over 1 billion Euros sales, based on average annual and relative results between 2009 and 2011 in terms of growth, profitability and stock market performance.

Interest
Philippe Lazare has been frequently involved in promoting culture and innovation in business through conferences (employer organization MEDEF conferences, Rencontres Economiques d'Aix en Provence).

In June 2013, Mr. Lazare was rated second in the "Telecom/IT/hardware" European Extel Survey.
This survey, conducted in March and May 2013 among managers and financial analysts, rates the quality of financial communication among listed European companies.

References 

Living people
1956 births